Carne is a 1991 French drama short film written and directed by Gaspar Noé, starring Philippe Nahon and Blandine Lenoir. It tells the story of a horse butcher with a mute daughter. At a running time of 38 minutes, it was the first longer film directed by Noé. The narrative was continued in Noé's 1998 full-length debut, I Stand Alone.

Plot
A nameless horse butcher, whose wife left him soon after their mute daughter was born, operates his own business while trying to raise the daughter. Despite the fact that she has become a teenager, the Butcher continues to wash her like a baby, and struggles to resist the temptation of committing incest.

On the day of the daughter's first menstruation, the Butcher misinterprets the situation and assumes that she's been raped by a worker, whom he immediately seeks out. However, this only leads to him stabbing an innocent worker in the mouth and crippling him to which the Butcher is imprisoned for the assault forced to sell not only his shop but also his apartment.

Even after he's released from prison (having been traumatized by his sexual relations with his cellmate, Gerard) the Butcher is unable to meet his daughter, who's ended up in a mental hospital, and is forced to work for a woman who runs a cafeteria.

He and the cafeteria owner end up in a relationship, which he comes to hate, and she ends up pregnant. He finally meets his daughter in the mental hospital but leaves, frustrated with his life and how it's turned out.

Cast
 Philippe Nahon as The Butcher
 Blandine Lenoir as The Butcher's Daughter
 Frankye Pain as The Butcher's Mistress
 Hélène Testud as The Maid

Production
The film was produced through Gaspar Noé and his girlfriend Lucile Hadžihalilović's company Les Cinémas de la Zone. It was shot in 16 mm CinemaScope which was blown up to 35 mm. An instrumental version the song "Ahwak", composed by the 20th-century Egyptian singer and composer Mohammed Abdel Wahab and originally sung by the Egyptian singer and actor Abdel Halim Hafez, plays when the halal butchery is first shown in the film.

Blandine Lenoir said she was 15 at the time of filming.

Release
The film premiered in the short film section of the 1991 International Critics' Week in Cannes. It won the top prize in its section, as well as the Georges Sadoul Prize and the Prix Très Special. Carne was eventually given a theatrical release in France and started a trend of theatrical distribution for films with similar length.

References in other media
Johnny Weeks describes the beginning of the film Carne in "Hard Cases", the fourth episode of the second season of the TV series The Wire.

References

External links
 

1991 drama films
1991 films
Films directed by Gaspar Noé
1990s French-language films
French drama short films
1991 short films
1990s French films